Alfred Wunderlich (29 December 1901 in Dresden – 21 May 1963) was a German politician of the National Democratic Party of Germany (East Germany). He was a member of the Nazi Party from 1933 to 1936.

1901 births
1963 deaths
Politicians from Dresden
People from the Kingdom of Saxony
Nazi Party members
National Democratic Party of Germany (East Germany) politicians
Members of the Provisional Volkskammer
Members of the 1st Volkskammer
Members of the 2nd Volkskammer
Recipients of the Patriotic Order of Merit in silver